Heartbreaker(s) or The Heart Breaker(s) may refer to:

Film and television
The Heart Breakers, a 1916 film starring Andrew Arbuckle
The Heart Breaker, a 1925 film directed by Benjamin Stoloff
Heartbreaker (1983 film), an American film directed by Frank Zuniga
Heartbreakers (1984 film), an American drama directed by Bobby Roth
Heartbreakers (2001 film), an American romantic comedy crime film directed by David Mirkin
Heartbreaker (2010 film), a French romantic comedy directed by Pascal Chaumeil
Heartbeat (2016 TV series) (working title Heartbreaker), an American medical comedy-drama series
"Heartbreaker" (Grimm), a television episode

Literature
Heartbreaker, a 2000 novel by Julie Garwood
Heartbreaker, a 2018 novel by Claudia Dey
Heartbreakers, a comic book series published by Dark Horse Comics, IDW Publishing, and Image Comics

Music

Performers
The Heartbreakers, or Johnny Thunders and the Heartbreakers, an American punk rock band
Tom Petty and the Heartbreakers, an American rock band

Albums
Heartbreaker (Dionne Warwick album), or the title song (see below), 1982
The Heartbreaker Demos, an album containing the demos made by Barry Gibb for Warwick's album, 2006
Heartbreaker (Dolly Parton album), or the title song (see below), 1978
Heartbreaker (Free album), or the title song, 1973
Heartbreaker (G-Dragon album), or the title song (see below), 2009
Heartbreaker (Inna album) or the title song, 2020
Heartbreaker (Marie Ueda album) or the title song, 2020
Heartbreaker (The O'Jays album), or the title song, 1993
Heartbreaker (Ryan Adams album), 2000
Heartbreakers (soundtrack), by Tangerine Dream, from the 1984 film
Heartbreaker, by BZN, 1986
Heartbreaker, by the Dark Romantics, 2008
Heartbreaker, by Marmalade, 1982

Songs
"Heartbreaker" (Dionne Warwick song), 1982
"Heartbreaker" (Dolly Parton song), 1978
"Heartbreaker" (G-Dragon song), 2009
"Heartbreaker" (Justin Bieber song), 2013
"Heartbreaker" (Led Zeppelin song), 1969
"Heartbreaker" (Loïc Nottet song), 2020
"Heartbreaker" (Mariah Carey song), 1999
"Heartbreaker" (Pat Benatar song), 1979
"Heartbreaker" (Teriyaki Boyz song), 2006
"Heartbreaker" (will.i.am song), 2008
"Heartbreaker"/"Days", by the Rasmus, 2002
"Doo Doo Doo Doo Doo (Heartbreaker)", by the Rolling Stones, 1973
"Heartbreaker", by Airbourne from Runnin' Wild, 2007
"Heartbreaker", by Alabama Shakes from Boys & Girls, 2012
"Heartbreaker", by the Andrews Sisters and the Harmonica Gentlemen, 1948
"Heartbreaker", by Axel Rudi Pell from Shadow Zone, 2002
"Heartbreaker", by B.B. King from Blues on Top of Blues, 1968
"Heartbreaker", by Brett Eldredge from Brett Eldredge, 2017
"Heartbreaker", by Caravan from The Album, 1980
"Heartbreaker", by the Cardigans from First Band on the Moon, 1996
"Heartbreaker", by Color Me Badd from C.M.B., 1991
"Heartbreaker", by the Crows, 1953
"Heartbreaker", by Danity Kane from Danity Kane, 2006
"Heartbreaker", by the Dukes, 1979
"Heartbreaker", by Electric Light Orchestra from Electric Light Orchestra Part Two, 1990
"Heartbreaker", by Enrique Iglesias from Euphoria, 2010
"Heartbreaker", by Girls from Broken Dreams Club, 2010
"Heartbreaker", by Grand Funk Railroad from On Time, 1969
"Heartbreaker", by Metronomy from Nights Out, 2008
"Heartbreaker", by Michael Jackson from Invincible, 2001
"Heartbreaker", by Motörhead from Aftershock, 2013
"Heartbreaker", by MSTRKRFT from Fist of God, 2009
"Heartbreaker", by Mumzy Stranger, 2011
"Heartbreaker", by Musical Youth from The Youth of Today, 1982
"Heartbreaker", by Nicole Scherzinger from Big Fat Lie, 2014
"Heartbreaker", by Pink, a B-side of the single "Stupid Girls", 2006
"Heartbreaker", by Steve Aoki from Wonderland, 2012
"Heartbreaker", by the Strawbs from Burning for You, 1977
"Heartbreaker", by Tank from Sex, Love & Pain, 2007
"Heartbreaker", by Zapp from Zapp III, 1983
"Heartbreaker", written by Ned Miller, 1933

Professional wrestling
The Heartbreakers (wrestlers) or The Heart Throbs, a professional wrestling tag team

See also
Heartbreak (disambiguation)
Broken Heart (disambiguation)